Trollhammaren is an EP from Finnish band Finntroll. It was released on April 13, 2004, by Spinefarm.

In an unusual style, this album incorporates an accordion for the intro and chorus.

Track listing 
 "Trollhammaren" (The Trollhammer) (lyrics: Wilska, music: Trollhorn/Tundra) – 3:29
 "Hemkomst" (Homecoming) (lyrics: Wilska, music: Trollhorn) – 3:46
 "Skog" (Forest) (lyrics/music: Routa) – 3:23
 "Försvinn du som lyser (Metal Version)" (Begone, You Who Shine) (lyrics: Katla, music: Somnium) – 2:17
 "Hel vete" (Whole Wheat) (lyrics: Wilska, music: Tundra) – 4:14

Personnel 
Mikael "Routa" Karlbom – guitar
Samuli "Skrymer" Ponsimaa – guitar
Samu "Beast Dominator" Ruotsalainen – drums
Henri "Trollhorn" Sorvali – keyboards
Sami "Tundra" Uusitalo – bass
Tapio Wilska – vocals

Notes

External links 
 

Finntroll albums
2004 EPs

de:Nattfödd#Trollhammaren EP